Fly Air Limited is a Bulgarian aircraft manufacturer based in Trudovec, headed by Simeon Simeonov. The company specializes in the design and manufacture of ultralight aircraft, including ultralight trikes, powered parachutes and powered paragliders. The company was originally located in Pravets.

The company's aircraft emphasize simplicity and portability, including ground transport by automobile. Ultralight trikes, such as the Fly Air Trike Moster and the now out-of-production Fly Air Swallow, use simple square steel tube construction. Most designs use the Italian Vittorazi Moster 185 two-stroke powerplant.

The company supplies AirDesign paramotor wings with its paramotors. In April 2017 the company became a dealer for La Mouette hang glider wings.

Aircraft 
Summary of aircraft built by Fly Air Limited:
Fly Air Double Seat Trike
Fly Air Paramotor
Fly Air Paratrike
Fly Air Swallow
Fly Air Trike Moster

References

External links

Aircraft manufacturers of Bulgaria
Ultralight aircraft
Ultralight trikes
Powered parachutes
Paragliders